Jimmy Aubrey (23 October 1887 – 2 September 1983) was an English actor who worked with both Charlie Chaplin and Laurel and Hardy, having gone with Fred Karno's theatrical company to America in 1908. However he left to start on his own in vaudeville. He started in comedies, then went on to comedic roles in drama.

He appeared in 419 films between 1915 and 1953.

Selected filmography

External links

1887 births
1983 deaths
Hal Roach Studios actors
English male film actors
English male silent film actors
People from Bolton
20th-century English male actors
20th-century English comedians
British expatriate male actors in the United States